Ghost Stories is the fourth studio album by Canadian singer/songwriter Chantal Kreviazuk, released on August 29, 2006. The first single released from the album was "All I Can Do". The second was "Wonderful" and the third was "Ghosts of You".

The album, produced entirely by Kreviazuk's husband, Our Lady Peace member Raine Maida, does not have a single guitar on any of the tracks. According to Kreviazuk, most of the album has a gospel theme to it.

The album debuted at #2 on the Canadian Albums Chart making it Chantal Kreviazuk's highest charting album of her career. Less than a month later the album was certified Gold by the CRIA.

On March 9, 2007, the album was released on the iTunes Store as Ghost Stories (With Interview Tracks), including additional songs and about 30 minutes of interviews with Kreviazuk.

Track listing
 "Ghosts of You" – 3:58
 "All I Can Do" – 3:36
 "Spoke In Tongues" – 3:13
 "Mad About You" – 3:46
 "So Cold" – 2:20
 "Waiting For The Sun" – 3:48
 "You Blame Yourself" – 4:08
 "Grow Up So Fast" – 3:27
 "Wonderful" – 3:33
 "Asylum" – 4:13
 "Wendy House" – 6:09

USA bonus tracks 
 "Time" – 4:06 (Originally from the album What If It All Means Something)
 "I Do Believe" – 3:55 (Co-written and co-produced by Brian West & Gerald Eaton)

USA bonus disc
 "God Made Me (Live)" – 3:26
 "Wayne (Live)" – 5:26

Singles
"All I Can Do"
"Wonderful"
"Ghosts of You"

Personnel
 Chantal Kreviazuk – vocals, piano, bass guitar
 Chris Chaney – bass guitar
 Jason Lader – bass guitar
 Raine Maida – bass guitar
 Trey Henry – double bass
 Earl Harvin – drums
 Randy Cooke – drums, percussion
 Lenny Castro – percussion
 The Section Quartet
 Eric Gorfain – strings
 Daphne Chen – strings
 Richard Dodd – strings
 Leah Katz – strings

References

Chantal Kreviazuk albums
2006 albums
Albums produced by Raine Maida